KMA could refer to:

Kanpur metropolitan area, in India
KMA (AM), a radio station (960 AM) licensed to Shenandoah, Iowa, United States
KMA-FM, a radio station (99.1 FM) licensed to Clarinda, Iowa, United States
KMA (art), a collaboration between media artists Kit Monkman and Tom Wexler
 Knoxville Museum of Art in Knoxville, Tennessee
Kent Miners' Association
Koninklijke Militaire Academie, the Royal Dutch Military Academy
Korea Military Academy, South Korea 
The Korea Meteorological Administration, South Korea 
Korea Medical Association, South Korea
Kursk Magnetic Anomaly
Kerala Mathematical Association, Kerala, India
Korean martial arts
Kumasi Metropolitan Assembly
 KMA, IATA airport code of Kerema Airport in Papua New Guinea